Schefflera acaropunctata is a flowering plant in the family Araliaceae. It is endemic to Venezuela.

References

acaropunctata